The Italy national beach soccer team represents Italy in international beach soccer competitions and is controlled by the Federazione Italiana Giuoco Calcio, the governing body for football in Italy.

Competitive record

FIFA Beach Soccer World Cup Qualification (UEFA)

Current squad

Coach: Emiliano Del Luca

Achievements
 Euro Beach Soccer League 2005 winner
 Euro Beach Soccer League 2018 winner

References

External links
 Federazione Italiana Giuoco Calcio
 FIFA.com entry
 Profile on Beach Soccer Russia

European national beach soccer teams
Beach soccer
national